The Fiscal Responsibility Act 2010 (c.3) is an Act of the Parliament of the United Kingdom that received Royal Assent on 10 February 2010. The Act was repealed by section 10(c) of the Budget Responsibility and National Audit Act 2011 on 23 March 2011.

It was first presented (first reading) in the House of Commons on 10 December 2009 and received its third reading on 20 January 2010. It was first read in the House of Lords on 21 January 2010 and received its second and third readings on 10 February 2010.

References

United Kingdom Acts of Parliament 2010